Richard Davy (c. 1465–1507) was a Renaissance composer, organist and choirmaster, one of the most represented in the Eton Choirbook.

Biography
Little is known about the life of Richard Davy. His name was a common one in Devon and he may have been born there. He was a scholar of Magdalen College, Oxford, and acted as choir master and organist at least in the period 1490-2. Churchwardens' accounts for Ashburton, Devon, mention a 'Dom. Richardus Dave:' from 1493-5, where he may have been acting as a chaplain or as master of the nearby school at St. Lawrence Chapel. He may then have moved to Exeter Cathedral to be vicar choral in the period 1497-1506.

Work and influence
Davy is the second most represented composer in the Eton choirbook, with nine compositions including his most celebrated work, the Passio Domini in ramis palmarum or Passion according to St Matthew. His work is considered more florid than that of his contemporaries Robert Fayrfax and William Cornish and may have had considerable impact on later figures such as John Taverner.

Notes

Renaissance composers
English classical organists
British male organists
English choral conductors
British male conductors (music)
English classical composers
1465 births
1507 deaths
15th-century English people
16th-century English composers
Alumni of Magdalen College, Oxford
English male classical composers
Male classical organists